Sinistrella sinistralis is a left-handed species of sea snail, a marine gastropod mollusk unassigned in the superfamily Conoidea.

Description

Distribution
This marine species occurs off Senegal.

References

External links
 Petit de la Saussaye S. (1838). Description de trois espèces nouvelles des genres Carocolle, Pleurotome et Marginelle. Revue Zoologique, par la Société Cuviérienne

Conoidea